Enrique Burgos García (born 20 Abril 1946) is a Mexican politician affiliated with the PRI. He currently serves as Senator of the LXII Legislature of the Mexican Congress representing Querétaro. He also served as Governor of Querétaro between 1991 and 1997 and members of the Chamber of Deputies during the LIX Legislature.

Biography 
Is a Mexican politician member of the Institutional Revolutionary Party, He has served as Governor of Queretaro, Director of DIF, mayor of San Juan del Rio, federal deputy in the LIX Legislature of the Congress of the Union of Mexico. Currently he is for the second time, Senator of the Republic by the State of Querétaro by the PRI and the vice-chair of the Board.

Today is a columnist for the newspaper "El Universal" and its affiliates since 1998 and author of Our Constitution every day (2007), a compilation of articles published between 1998 and 2004. He serves as national adviser also of the Mexican Red Cross. As an attorney, he is head of the Public Notary Office No. 3 in San Juan del Rio, Queretaro.

References

1946 births
Living people
People from Querétaro City
Institutional Revolutionary Party politicians
Members of the Chamber of Deputies (Mexico)
Members of the Senate of the Republic (Mexico)
Presidents of the Senate of the Republic (Mexico)
Governors of Querétaro
Politicians from Querétaro
21st-century Mexican politicians
Members of the Constituent Assembly of Mexico City
20th-century Mexican politicians
Members of the Congress of Querétaro
Senators of the LXII and LXIII Legislatures of Mexico